Seventeen Mile is an undeveloped locality in the Lockyer Valley Region, Queensland, Australia.

Geography
The terrain is mountainous with the highest peak being Mount Cross (627 metres). Most of the south-east of the locality is within the Lockyer National Park.

History 
The locality was named and bounded on 18 February 2000.

References 

Lockyer Valley Region
Localities in Queensland